Milesia plumipes is a species of hoverfly in the family Syrphidae.

Distribution
Thailand, Malaysia.

References

Insects described in 1990
Eristalinae
Diptera of Asia